Mirza Hasan Lengeh (also Romanized as Mīrzā Ḩasan Lengeh) is a village in Machian Rural District, Kelachay District, Rudsar County, Gilan Province, Iran. At the 2006 census, its population was 84, in 22 families.

References 

Populated places in Rudsar County